Centre-right Civic Initiative was a non-governamental organization in Romania. It was founded by former Prime Minister Mihai-Răzvan Ungureanu.

The initiative ran at autumn 2012 legislative elections within Right Romania Alliance (ARD).

Electoral history

Legislative elections

Notes:

1 Right Romania Alliance (ARD) members: PDL (22 senators and 52 deputies), FC (1 senator and 3 deputies), and PNȚCD (1 senator and 1 deputy).

Political organizations based in Romania